Sadanandan Anish (born on November 17, 1984) is an Indian cricketer from Pathanamthitta who plays domestic cricket for Kerala. He is a right handed batsman and right arm offspinner.

References

Indian cricketers
Kerala cricketers
1984 births
Living people